A proleg is a small, fleshy, stub structure found on the ventral surface of the abdomen of most larval forms of insects of the order Lepidoptera, though they can also be found on other larval insects such as sawflies and a few other types of insects. In all the orders in which they appear, mainly Hymenoptera and Lepidoptera, prolegs of any form evolved independently of each other by convergent evolution.

Prolegs of lepidopteran larvae have a small circle of gripping hooks, called "crochets".  The arrangement of the crochets can be helpful in identification to family level. Although the point has been debated, prolegs are not widely regarded as true legs, derived from the primitive uniramous limbs. Certainly in their morphology they are not jointed, and so lack the five segments (coxa, trochanter, femur, tibia, tarsus) of thoracic insect legs. Prolegs do have limited musculature, but much of their movement is hydraulically powered.

See also 
 Terrestrial locomotion in animals

References

 Peterson, A. 1948. Larvae Of Insects. Part I: Lepidoptera & Hymenoptera; Part II: Coleoptera, Diptera, Neuroptera, Siphonaptera, Mecoptera, Trichoptera. Columbus, OH.
 Richards, O.W. & R.G. Davies. 1977. Imm's General Textbook of Entomology, 10th ed. (2 Volumes). Chapman & Hall, London.
 Snodgrass, R.E. 1935 (1993 reprint). Principles of Insect Morphology. Cornell University Press, Ithaca, NY.

External links

 How Many Legs Do Caterpillars Have?

Insect anatomy
Larvae